Nils Gunnar Lindström (11 February 1896 – 6 October 1951) was a Swedish javelin thrower. He competed at the 1920, 1924 and 1928 Summer Olympics and finished in sixth, second and fourteenth place, respectively. His younger brother Elof was also an Olympic javelin thrower.

On 12 October 1924 Lindström set a world record at 66.62 m that stood for three years. During his athletics career he won six national titles, in the conventional and two-handed javelin throw, in 1920, 1921, 1924 (2), 1926 and 1927. After retiring he worked as an agricultural consultant and owned a farm outside Eksjö.

References

1896 births
1951 deaths
Swedish male javelin throwers
Olympic athletes of Sweden
Athletes (track and field) at the 1920 Summer Olympics
Athletes (track and field) at the 1924 Summer Olympics
Athletes (track and field) at the 1928 Summer Olympics
Olympic silver medalists for Sweden
World record setters in athletics (track and field)
Medalists at the 1924 Summer Olympics
Olympic silver medalists in athletics (track and field)